Croatia is a sovereign state between Central Europe, Southeast Europe, and the Mediterranean. The service sector dominates Croatia's economy, followed by the industrial sector and agriculture. Tourism is a significant source of revenue during the summer, with Croatia ranked the 18th most popular tourist destination in the world. The state controls a part of the economy, with substantial government expenditure. The European Union is Croatia's most important trading partner. Since 2000, the Croatian government constantly invests in infrastructure, especially transport routes and facilities along the Pan-European corridors. Internal sources produce a significant portion of energy in Croatia; the rest is imported. Croatia provides a universal health care system and free primary and secondary education, while supporting culture through numerous public institutions and corporate investments in media and publishing.

For further information on the types of business entities in this country and their abbreviations, see "Business entities in Croatia".

Notable firms 
This list includes notable companies with primary headquarters located in the country. The industry and sector follow the Industry Classification Benchmark taxonomy. Organizations which have ceased operations are included and noted as defunct.

References

External links 
 Official Register of Companies
 Croatian Chamber of Economy
 List of Croatian companies classified by NACE
  Details and an extensive list of companies in Croatia

Croatia